The Spice WSC (known under various names, including Spice DR-3, Spice WSC94, Spice HC94, Spice BDG-02, Spice SC95, and the SCI Spice, during its time of development) is a series of sports prototype race cars, designed, developed, and built by British manufacturer Spice Engineering, to the new World Sports Car regulations, in 1994. It was derived from the Spice SE90C Group C sports car.

References

Sports prototypes
Le Mans Prototypes